Jamie Murray and John Peers were the defending champions, but they chose to compete in Casablanca instead.
Bob Bryan and Mike Bryan won the title, defeating David Marrero and Fernando Verdasco in the final, 4–6, 6–4, [11–9]

Seeds

  Bob Bryan /  Mike Bryan (champions)
  David Marrero /  Fernando Verdasco (final)
  Santiago González /  Scott Lipsky (first round)
  Mate Pavić /  John-Patrick Smith (first round)

Draw

Draw

References
Main draw

Doubles